Gilsinho is the Portuguese diminutive of the name Gilson. Gilsinho may refer to:
Gilsinho (footballer, born 1977), born Gílson Domingos Rezende Agostinho, Brazilian football striker
Gilsinho (footballer, born 1981), born Gilson Adriano de Oliveira, Brazilian football midfielder
Gilsinho (footballer, born 1984), born Gilson do Amaral, Brazilian football striker
Gilsinho (footballer, born 1991), born Gilson Silva Goes, Brazilian football winger